Entomobrya clitellaria is a species in the family Entomobryidae ("slender springtails"), in the order Entomobryomorpha ("elongate-bodied springtails").

References

External links
NCBI Taxonomy Browser, Entomobrya clitellaria

Collembola
Animals described in 1903